Robert "Bob" Charles Frojen (December 1, 1930 – December 11, 2005) was an American water polo player who competed in the 1956 Summer Olympics.

He was born in Hamburg, Germany.

Frojen was a member of the American water polo team which finished fifth in the 1956 tournament. He played all six matches.

In 1981, he was inducted into the USA Water Polo Hall of Fame.

References

External links
 

1930 births
2005 deaths
American male water polo players
Olympic water polo players of the United States
Water polo players at the 1956 Summer Olympics